A One Day International (ODI) is an international cricket match between two teams, each having ODI status, as determined by the International Cricket Council. The women's variant of the game is similar to the men's version, with minor modifications to umpiring and pitch requirements. The first women's ODI was played in 1973, between England and Australia. The Pakistan women's team played their first ODI match in January 1997, a match they lost by 10 wickets to New Zealand at the Hagley Oval, Christchurch.

This list includes all players who have played at least one ODI match and is initially arranged in the order of debut appearance. Where more than one player won their first cap in the same match, those players are initially listed alphabetically by last name at the time of debut.

Key

Players
Statistics are correct as of 21 January 2023.

ODI captains

References

External links

  
Pakistan
Women ODI cricketers
ODI cricketers